Federico Ubaldo della Rovere (16 May 1605 – 28 June 1623) was Duke of Urbino and the father of Vittoria della Rovere.

Biography

The eldest son and heir of Francesco Maria II, Duke of Urbino. His parents were cousins.

Francesco Maria II della Rovere, his father was anxious for heirs to the Duchy of Urbino. His first wife died in 1598 without children. After obtaining permission from the pope to marry, in 1599 married his cousin Livia della Rovere to prevent the extinction of the family. Federico Ubaldo was the product of this second marriage. 

At the age of 16 he succeeded to the Duchy of Urbino on 3 November 1621. This same year, in order to produce an heir himself, he married Claudia de' Medici, daughter of Ferdinando I de' Medici, Grand Duke of Tuscany and Christina of Lorraine. The following year, Claudia gave birth to a daughter Vittoria della Rovere.

Federico died a year later in Urbino. He was likely poisoned, but autopsy results claim that he died with an epileptic seizure. The funeral took place on the following Sunday, 2 July, and was accompanied by the whole clergy. The confraternity and 125 high noblemen, all dressed in mourning, with a torch in their hands, the funeral procession went through the city, in front of the whole population of the city of Urbino. His father resumed the throne and saw the disappearance of the line. His father was forced to bequeath all his property to the Papal States. Claudia de' Medici married in 1626 Leopold V of Austria. Their daughter married the Grand Duke of Tuscany in 1633 but her bloodline died out in 1737.

Issue

Vittoria della Rovere (7 February 1622 – 5 March 1694) married Ferdinando II de' Medici, Grand Duke of Tuscany and had issue.

References

1605 births
1623 deaths
Italian people with disabilities
Neurological disease deaths in Marche
Della Rovere family
Dukes of Urbino
People from Pesaro
Modern child monarchs
Deaths from epilepsy
17th-century Italian nobility
Royalty and nobility with disabilities